was a Japanese  painter and painting teacher in Taishō and Shōwa Japan.

Life 
Born Chigusa Kitani at Kita-ku, Osaka , the center of the Osaka (the second largest metropolitan area in Japan), in 1895 under the name . She moved to Tokyo in 1913 (Taishō 2) to study under .

Kitano is famous painter who draws ( . In 1919, She started studying under  in Kyoto.

She trained in Seattle, Washington, in the United States for two years from the age of 13, and her work was exhibited throughout Japan. In 1920, she married , a researcher on Chikamatsu Monzaemon (dramatist of jōruri). She aimed to nurture, instruct and improve the status of female painters.

She died in 1947 (Shōwa 22) in the Minamikawachi of Osaka at the age of 51.

Works 

Gallery

Further reading

See also
 
  was an art movement in early 20th-century Japan
 Shima Seien
 List of Cultural Properties of Japan - paintings (Ōsaka)

References

Sources 
 KITANI (YOSHIOKA) Chigusa«Ongoku»｜Our Collection｜Artrip Museum : Nakanoshima Museum of Art, Osaka - Osaka City Museum Of Modern Art. Retrieved 2020-04-18.

External links 

 KITANI (YOSHIOKA) Chigusa«Ongoku»｜Our Collection｜Artrip Museum : Nakanoshima Museum of Art, Osaka - Osaka City Museum Of Modern Art, JAPAN

1895 births
1947 deaths
20th-century Japanese painters
20th-century Japanese women artists
Nihonga painters